

Championship recognition

1884–1910 
Champions were recognized by public acclamation. A champion in that era was a fighter who had a notable win over another fighter and kept winning afterward. Retirements or disputed results could lead to a championship being split among several men for periods of time.

1910–1961

Championship awarding organizations 
 The International Boxing Union (IBU), formed in Paris in 1910. Changed name to European Boxing Union in 1946. It organised world title fights from 1913 to 1963 after which it was incorporated into the World Boxing Council (WBC).
 The New York State Athletic Commission (NYSAC), formed in 1920. It organised world title bouts until the early 1970s when it became a member of World Boxing Council (WBC).
 The National Boxing Association (NBA) formed in the United States in 1921.
 Other bodies including the National Sporting Club in Great Britain and the California State Athletic Commission also awarded world titles.
An Australian version of the world title which existed briefly between 1914 and 1916 gained considerable credibility because its holder, Les Darcy, was widely believed to be best boxer in the world in this division.

1961–present

Championship awarding organizations 
 The World Boxing Association (WBA), founded in 1921 as the National Boxing Association (NBA); it changed its name in 1961 and allowed membership from outside the United States.
 The World Boxing Council (WBC), founded in 1963.
 The International Boxing Federation (IBF), founded in 1983.
 The World Boxing Organization (WBO), founded in 1988.

List of champions

See also
List of Australian middleweight boxing champions
List of British middleweight boxing champions
 List of British world boxing champions
List of New Zealand middleweight boxing champions
World Negro Middleweight Championship
World Colored Middleweight Championship

References

Middleweight Champions

World boxing champions by weight class